The Women's 4 × 100 metre medley relay competition of the 2016 European Aquatics Championships was held on 22 May 2016.

Records
Prior to the competition, the existing world, European and championship records were as follows.

Results

Heats
The heats were held at 09:59.

Final
The final was held on 22 May at 17:06.

References

Women's 4 x 100 metre medley relay
2016 in women's swimming